Pusey is a village and civil parish  east of Faringdon in the Vale of White Horse district. It was part of Berkshire until the 1974 boundary changes transferred it to Oxfordshire.

History
Pusey seems to be a Saxon settlement. Its toponym is derived from the Old English pise ēg, meaning "pea island".  The Domesday Book of 1086 records the village as Pesei.  The Pusey family held the manor of Pusey from Saxon times. There is a tradition that it was granted to the family by Cnut the Great, by the delivery of a horn (an Anglo-Saxon form of land tenure known as "cornage"). The Pusey Horn is now in the Victoria and Albert Museum in London.  In Anglo-saxon an inscription on the horn reads:Kyng Knowde geue Wyllyam Pewte thys horne to holde by thy land" (King Canute gave William Pusey this horn to hold by [it] the land")

In 1753, the family built Pusey House (not to be confused with Pusey House, Oxford), a Grade II* listed country house. It was designed by John Sanderson for John Allen Pusey. Edward Bouverie Pusey, English churchman and Regius Professor of Hebrew at Oxford, was born there in 1800.  The Church of England parish church of All Saints was rebuilt in 1745–50 by John Allen Pusey, at his own expense. The south transept monument was built by Peter Scheemakers in memory of John Allen Pusey and his wife Jane.

References

Sources and further reading

External links

Royal Berkshire History: Pusey House

Civil parishes in Oxfordshire
Villages in Oxfordshire